Bignonia is a genus of flowering plants in the family Bignoniaceae. Its genus and family were named after Jean-Paul Bignon by his protégé Joseph Pitton de Tournefort in 1694, and the genus was established as part of modern botanical nomenclature in 1753 by Carl Linnaeus. Species have been recorded from the southern USA, Central to most of South America.

Species
Species include:
Bignonia binata Thunb.
Bignonia bracteomana (K.Schum. ex Sprague) L.G.Lohmann
Bignonia callistegioides Cham.
Bignonia campanulata Cham.
Bignonia capreolata L.
Bignonia convolvuloides (Bureau & K.Schum.) L.G.Lohmann
Bignonia corymbosa (Vent.) L.G.Lohmann
Bignonia costata (Bureau & K.Schum.) L.G.Lohmann
Bignonia cuneata (Dugand) L.G.Lohmann
Bignonia decora (S.Moore) L.G.Lohmann
Bignonia diversifolia Kunth
Bignonia hyacinthina (Standl.) L.G.Lohmann
Bignonia lilacina (A.H.Gentry) L.G.Lohmann
Bignonia longiflora Cav.
Bignonia magnifica W.Bull
Bignonia microcalyx G.Mey.
Bignonia neouliginosa L.G.Lohmann
Bignonia nocturna (Barb.Rodr.) L.G.Lohmann
Bignonia noterophila Mart. ex DC.
Bignonia phellosperma (Hemsl.) L.G.Lohmann
Bignonia potosina (K.Schum. & Loes.) L.G.Lohmann
Bignonia prieurei DC.
Bignonia pterocalyx (Sprague ex Urb.) L.G.Lohmann
Bignonia ramantacea (Mart. ex DC.) L.G.Lohmann
Bignonia sciuripabula (K.Schum.) L.G.Lohmann
Bignonia sordida (Bureau & K.Schum.) L.G.Lohmann
Bignonia uleana (Kraenzl.) L.G.Lohmann

References

External links

 
Bignoniaceae genera
Taxa named by Joseph Pitton de Tournefort